The Dewoitine D.35 was a small, single-engine passenger transport aircraft built and flown by Dewoitine in France for their own use in the early 1930s.  Only one was produced.

Design and development

The D.35 was built solely as a company taxi to carry Dewoitine personnel between Paris and Toulouse. It was a high wing strut braced monoplane with its passenger cabin under the wing.  The D.35's 230 hp (170 kW) Hispano-Suiza 9Qb radial engine was uncowled.  The undercarriage was wide track, with single mainwheels on V-form struts mounted on the fuselage; a small tailskid completed the conventional landing gear.

Operational history
The D.35 was registered in February 1932 after about a year of testing. During the testing period, on the first weekend in July 1931, the D.35 attended an aviation meeting at Clermont-Ferrand, where it was one of sixty-six aircraft competing in the International Rally. This was a test of economical load-carrying, the aim being to achieve the maximum value of (distance flown)2×people on board/engine power. Stops were allowed but the total distance had to be flown within eight hours. The D.35, piloted by George Delage and carrying six passengers, flew 1,573 km (977 mi) and managed third place.

In 1933 the D.35 became the personal aircraft of Dewoitine's chief test pilot, Marcel Doret.  There is no record of it on the French register after 1937, prompting speculation that it may have gone to Spain for government use in the Spanish Civil War.

Specifications

References

1930s French civil aircraft
D.35
Aircraft first flown in 1931
High-wing aircraft
Single-engined tractor aircraft